The Staatstheater Kassel is a state-owned and operated theater in Kassel, Germany.

History 
A permanent theatre house existed in Kassel during the first decade of the 17th century. It stood immediately next to the Ottoneum near the State Theatre which is now used as a Natural History Museum and is considered one of the oldest of its kind north of the Alps. Further buildings were constructed for use as public theatre venues, and in the 18th century the opera house was erected on Königsstraße, in which the singer Elisabeth Mara staged her first success and which was conducted by Louis Spohr.

On the orders of the German emperor Kaiser Wilhelm II, a theatre was built in 1909 possessing one of the largest stages in the country and seating for an audience of over 1,450. The building was heavily damaged during World War II. The architectural competition for a replacement was won by Hans Scharoun but his ideas were not implemented – instead, the plans of architects Paul Bode and Ernst Brunding were realized; construction finished in 1959 (the competition models are on display at the Kassel City Museum). In 1989 an additional auditorium with 99 seats, the studio stage TIF – Theater im Fridericianum (Kassel), was erected.

The state theatre's orchestra has one of Germany's longest traditions, having been mentioned as Court Orchestra as early as 1502.

Operation 
 
Performances take place almost daily, and each year around 30 pieces of various genres are presented. The theatre employs around 500 people including general director Thomas Bockelmann (since 2004) and Johannes Wieland, artistic director and choreographer of the theatre's dance company (since 2006). The opera house has 953 seats, the Playhouse Theatre 540 seats and the Fridericianum 99 seats. With its total number of 1,592 seats, the theater recorded around 227,000 attendances in the 2008/09 season.

External links
Official Website of the Staatstheater Kassel

German opera companies
Opera houses in Germany
Theatre companies in Germany
Theatres completed in 1909
Theatres completed in 1959